Ethiromyia is a genus of flies in the family Dolichopodidae. It is distributed in the Holarctic realm.

Species
Ethiromyia chalybea  (Wiedemann, 1817) – Europe
Ethiromyia purpuratus  (Van Duzee, 1925) – Eastern Nearctic
Ethiromyia violacea  (Van Duzee, 1921) – Eastern Nearctic

References

Dolichopodinae
Dolichopodidae genera
Diptera of North America
Diptera of Europe